In Scientology, Operating Thetan (OT) is a notional spiritual status above Clear. It is defined as "knowing and willing cause over life, thought, matter, energy, space and time (MEST)." According to religious scholar J. Gordon Melton, "It’s basically a variation of the Gnostic myth about souls falling into matter and the encumbrances that come with that" with the exception in that instead of Divine intervention, there is Alien intervention. The Church teaches Operating Thetan doctrine in eight separate stages, or Levels; however, the Church claims there are actually fifteen Levels, and critics argue the Church uses the missing Levels to incentivize believers into giving more money to the Church in order to be able to experience them once they are finally released. Sometimes the Church requires believers to retake, and therefore pay again for, previous courses in the meantime as they await the missing Levels. Each course costs a considerable amount of money, often thousands of US dollars.

On March 24, 2008, WikiLeaks obtained and placed the complete set of Operating Thetan Levels the church currently uses on their site. The Church of Scientology tacitly verified the authenticity of these documents when they threatened legal action for copyright infringement if the documents were not removed, but WikiLeaks refused and the courts ruled that it was legal to download, use, read, and practice these teachings outside the Church thus making all 612 pages of the OT materials available for free.

Description
OT Levels are part of "The Bridge", which is the set of ranks within Scientology. After having removed one's own "reactive mind" and thus attaining the state of "Clear", Scientologists may then go on to the OT levels. Scientology doctrine defines OT as the "highest state there is". 

Operating Thetan is described within Scientology as a state of godliness, and Scientologists are taught they will have godlike control over "matter, energy, space and time" (known in Scientology jargon as MEST). Hubbard claimed that thetans were tricked into following religions, which prevented them from using their own power to create and destroy universes. The Church claims that the OT is not dependent on the universe and Scientologists who are at the Operating Thetan level claim that they have control over their lives and can "go exterior" from their bodies. 

While there are fifteen levels listed in Scientology teaching, the Church only offers eight. According to former Scientologist and critic of the Church Mike Rinder, the promise of new levels has been used for decades to motivate church members to donate or repeat courses they have already taken in preparation. Rinder has said he doesn't believe these courses exist.

The state of Operating Thetan is represented by a symbol consisting of the letters OT with the T inside the O and each of the points of the T ending at the O's circumference, which displays the level's initials, and is also intended to evoke the medieval O-T map representing the known world and, metaphorically, the entirety of the observable universe, over which a fully developed OT is believed to have immediate control.

Levels

OT I
"This Solo-audited level is the first step a Clear takes toward full OT abilities, and that first step is a fresh causative OT viewpoint of the MEST universe and other beings." The cost to move to level OT I was $2,750 as of 2013.

OT II
"By confronting hidden areas of one's existence on the whole track [that is, by confronting past incarnations], vast amounts of energy and attention are released. Those on this Solo-audited level experience a resurgence of self-determinism and native ability. OT II unlocks the aberrative factors on the whole track that have allowed the thetan to lose his innate freedom and ability and one achieves the ability to confront the whole track." The cost to move from OT I to OT II was $5,225 as of 2013.

OT III: Wall of Fire

Hubbard announced discovering an important breakthrough within less than a month of founding the Sea Org, the religious order of the church that consists of its most dedicated members. He described it as a "means of erasing those mental factors that stand in the way of peace and toleration of mankind." The new material made up the new Operating Thetan III.

"This Solo-audited level goes through what is called the 'Wall of Fire' that surrounds a previously impenetrable whole track mystery. What prevents a being from being himself? This level answers that question. Once complete, a being is free of the whole track overwhelm that has trapped him. Here he confronts and eradicates the fourth dynamic engram that has plagued this universe for millennia." The cost to move from OT II to OT III was $8,910 as of 2013.

Church dogma regards OT III as a dangerous process which can lead to pneumonia, to lack of sleep or even to death if not run correctly. In Church of Scientology of California v. Kaufman, it was noted that the defendant had been required to sign a waiver to the effect that "the Scientology Organization, its branches and members, and L. Ron Hubbard are not responsible for anything that might happen to my body or mind on OT III".

Within OT III is the secret doctrine of the church. Members must be invited to "do it", and they sign a contract of secrecy.

OT IV: OT Drug Rundown
"This level handles the hidden problems and stops in a being's universe caused by the effects of drugs and poisons on the whole track. This is the final polish that rids one of any last vestige of the effects of drugs on the spirit. Ministered at Advanced Organizations or Flag. Approximately 12½ to 25 hours."

OT V: New Era Dianetics for OTs
"The Second Wall of Fire consists of 26 separate rundowns and has been described as dealing with 'living lightning, the very stuff of life itself.' This level addresses the last aspects of one's case that can prevent him from achieving total freedom on all dynamics. An audited level ministered at Advanced Organizations or Flag. Approximately 50 hours."

OT VI: Hubbard Solo New Era Dianetics for OTs (Solo NOTs) Auditing Course
"The training one receives before starting to solo audit on New OT VII is so powerful that it actually constitutes an entire OT level. On Solo NOTs one is dealing with complexities intended to crush one's true power and abilities as a thetan. Solo NOTs auditors acquire a wide range of auditing skills to handle the vast phenomena that can occur on OT VIII. Approximately 3–4 weeks with the new Solo Auditor Course done."

OT VII: Hubbard Solo New Era Dianetics for OTs Auditing
"On New OT VII one solo audits at home daily. This is a lengthy level, requiring a considerable amount of time to complete. It is the final pre-OT level, and culminates in attainment of the state of CAUSE OVER LIFE."

OT VIII: Truth Revealed

OT VIII, the highest level in Scientology, is only offered  aboard the Freewinds ship. The original version of OT VIII was released in 1988 and was authored by Hubbard himself, while a second "revised" version was released in 1991 by an unnamed editor. Both versions were released after L. Ron Hubbard's death. The original contains a Doomsday Prophecy that the Galactic Confederacy will return soon and telepathically enslave the universe but Hubbard wrote that he will return after his death and in a Messiah like role "halt a series of events designed to make happy slaves of us all." Early participants in this version balked at it and the church subsequently revised it into its current form. The church initially stated the original version found in the Fishman Affidavit is a forgery but later admitted it was copyrighted by the church thus establishing authenticity. The revised version they currently use also has an editor's note that states "it is not the original".

The revised version is completely redacted from the original and states "This Solo-audited level addresses the primary cause of amnesia on the whole track and lets one see the truth of his own existence. This is the first actual OT level and brings about a resurgence of power and native abilities for the being himself. This may be done at the Flag Ship Service Organization."

Beyond Operating Thetan
Beyond the attainment of the state of Operating Thetan is that of Cleared Theta Clear, which Hubbard describes as such:

Criticism
A growing number of former Scientologists have made public allegations that the church encourages its members to complete very expensive courses and expect wonderful results; when the improvements fail to happen, further courses are then promoted to facilitate the anticipated changes. Criticism stems from a pattern of cycles wherein members continue to pay increasing amounts for these courses, while some even put their families into debt chasing the elusive life-changing results under the stewardship of the church.

Legal issues and copyright
In March 2008, WikiLeaks leaked the Church of Scientology's Operating Thetan documents. The Church of Scientology portrayed hosting the documentation as a copyright violation implying that the collection is Church doctrine. A court found that it was legal to download, use, read, and practice these teachings outside the Church.

In 1997, Zenon Panoussis, a resident of Sweden, sent copies of NOT (New OT) documents to various government authorities, thereby making the documents public according to the Swedish principle of public access to official records. The Church of Scientology responded by ordering members to continuously borrow the available copies in order to prevent non-members from reading them. The Church of Scientology also sued Panoussis for copyright infringement, since he had made the documents available online without authorization.

See also
 Body thetan

References

Further reading

External links
 
 Full documents
 
 Summary of Operating Thetan levels 1-8
 The Fishman Affidavit

Scientology beliefs and practices